Balaenula is an extinct genus of cetacean.

Taxonomy
Cladistic analyses of fossils and extant balaenids place Balaenula as the sister taxon of right whales in a clade separate from the bowhead whale.

Fossil records
This genus is known in the fossil records from the Neogene to the Quaternary (age range: from 11.608 to 1.806 million years ago). Fossils are found in the marine strata of Italy, United Kingdom, United States, the Netherlands, France and Japan.

The most complete specimen known from the U.S. (as well as the only one on display in North America) was found at Lake Waccamaw, North Carolina in 2008. The whale's skull was excavated from the limestone outcropping by the state's Underwater Archaeology Branch, prepared, and permanently displayed at the Lake Waccamaw Depot Museum starting 2012.

Species

There are two currently recognized species of Balaenula:

†Balaenula balaenopsis  Van Beneden, 1872 (Type)
†Balaenula astensis  Trevisan, 1942 (from Italy)

This species lived around four million years ago. Fossils have been found near Asti (Northern Italy), in a Zanclean/Piacenzian marine sandstone.

The only known specimen of B. balaenopsis was discovered in Belgium in the late 1800s.

An unnamed species from Japan (represented by a partial skeleton) is also known.

References

Prehistoric cetacean genera
Fossil taxa described in 1872
Pliocene cetaceans
Balaenidae